Matthew Arlington Batson (Anna, Illinois, US, 24 April 1866 – 13 January 1917) was a United States Army Officer who received the Medal of Honor for actions during the Philippine–American War. 1st Lieutenant Batson was awarded the medal for swimming the San Juan River under enemy fire. He was awarded his medal alongside Captain Hugh J. McGrath who performed the same feat. Batson is most noted, however, for creating the Philippine Scouts.

Early life
Batson was born in Anna Illinois, a small agricultural town located on the Illinois Central Railroad in Union County in southern Illinois but grew up in the Ozark Mountains of Missouri. Educated locally, he attended Southern Illinois University for one term. He had two stints of teaching school and spent a year studying law in hopes of passing the bar exam.

Military record
Batson enlisted in the 2nd United States Cavalry on 9 April 1888. His motives for doing so remain obscure. Over the next three years he served in troops M and G and attained the rank of corporal. Based on his service record and his marks on a competitive examination, the War Department offered him a commission as second lieutenant in the 9th Cavalry, one of two Regular Army cavalry regiments that consisted of black enlisted men led by white officers. He accepted on 2 August 1891. He spent the next seven years in the 9th Cavalry, primarily in garrison. He married and started to raise a family. During the academic year 1894–95 he attended the Infantry and Cavalry School at Fort Leavenworth, Kansas. Three years later, during the Spanish–American War, he accompanied the 9th Cavalry to Cuba and participated in the V Corps' campaign against Santiago. He had a credible record in combat at San Juan Hill, but the experience left him disillusioned. He felt that officers who had done less than he had received promotion and recognition while he had received none.

It was in this frame of mind that on 2 August 1898, Batson was promoted first lieutenant in the 4th Cavalry. Since 1891 promotion in the U.S. Army for all officers was by seniority in branch of service rather than by regiment. His promotion simply indicated that he was the senior cavalry second lieutenant in the Army at that time and that the next available vacancy at the grade of first lieutenant occurred in the 4th Cavalry. It did not constitute official recognition of his service in Cuba.

Batson accompanied the 4th Cavalry to the Philippines, arriving in October 1898, and joined the VIII Corps, then occupying only the city of Manila and a small area around the Cavite naval base. Initially, the corps commander, Maj. Gen. Elwell S. Otis, assigned the regiment to the 1st Division, VIII Corps, then commanded by Brig. Gen. Thomas M. Anderson and subsequently by Maj. General Henry W. Lawton. Eventually, Otis assigned a few troops of the 4th Cavalry to the 2nd Division but kept the bulk of the regiment with the 1st Division. Batson's troop remained with the 1st Division.

Fighting broke out between Philippine and American forces on the night of February 4–5 in what was the first clash of a war known as the Philippine Insurrection in the United States but which subsequent historians have often referred to as the Philippine War or the Philippine–American War. The 2nd Division guarded the northern approaches to Manila; the 1st Division the southern. Once the VIII Corps had cleared the Filipinos from the immediate environs of the city, all the strategic objectives—the only railroad in the Philippines and the Philippine capital at Malolos—lay north of the city. While the 2nd Division attacked north along the rail line toward Malolos, the 1st Division's mission became to keep any elements of the Philippine Army away from the city by launching punitive expeditions into the countryside to break up enemy troop concentrations. Batson continued to demonstrate the cool-headed courage under fire that he had first shown in Cuba. On one of these expeditions to Laguna Province, south of Manila, at the town of Calamba, he swam the San Juan River under fire, flanked enemy forces, and compelled them to retire. His commanding officer recommended him for the Medal of Honor. Two and one-half years later he received it.

Sometimes major historical events turn on chance and the actions of seemingly ordinary individuals. Matthew Batson, a mere lieutenant, was one of these. Batson had arrived in the Philippines disenchanted with the Army and unlike most of peers with seven years service in a predominately African-American regiment. Yes, he had acted heroically at San Juan Hill, but so had the black troopers that he led. He was well aware of their qualities but especially of their humanity. So he reached the Islands predisposed to judge people of color on their merits as individuals and not lump them together as racial inferiors. In short, he was moving in exactly the opposite direction of the larger American society of which he was a part. In that America, "Jim Crow" was becoming the law in the South and affecting white attitudes in the North as well.

A lieutenant's pay in the Philippines would go much further than in the United States so that sometime after Batson arrived he hired a body servant, a Filipino name Jacinto, whose last name is lost to history. Jacinto was an impressive person. He could already read and write when they first met. Batson studied language with him. Jacinto taught Batson Pampangan; Batson taught Jacinto English. Batson reported to his wife that Jacinto learned English faster than he learned Pampangan. Batson also learned that he came from the town of Macabebe in the province of Pampanga, north and west of Manila. The Macabebes are an ancient ethnic group whose origins are disputed. Since the sixteenth century they have had a fraught relationship with the Tagalogs, the largest ethnic group in the Philippines. Generally, whenever the Tagalogs wanted to do something the Macabebes took a diametrically opposed position. Thus in 1896 when the Tagalogs rose in rebellion against the Spanish, the Macabebes supported the Spanish colonial government. When war broke out between the Americans and the self-proclaimed Philippine Republic led by Emilio Aguinaldo the Macabebes maintained a cool neutrality toward both sides.

Batson's impressions about the war were slowly crystallizing in the spring of 1899. He admired the fighting qualities of his opponents. He did not call them "Gugus" or worse use the N-word as so many of his fellow officers did. He discounted the many rumors circulating in the VIII Corps about Filipino atrocities. He saw them as patriots fighting for their country; he wrote his wife that if he was a Filipino he would be fighting the Americans too. He thought to subdue the Islanders would require an Army of 100,000 men and many years—the cost in lives and money was far more, he thought, than the American people could stand. The only solution, he decided, was to raise native troops to fight against the Philippine revolutionary government. They would cost far less to equip and maintain than unacclimated Americans shipped across the Pacific Ocean. With this thought in mind, accompanied by two captains, a newspaper reporter, and forty enlisted men, he set off for the town of Macabebe sometime before June 1, 1899. The idea of raising a company of Macabebes never got off the ground, but he was very impressed with the inhabitants, who warmly welcomed the Americans. He came away even more impressed by their military potential and certain that a native force was not only feasible but necessary for American victory.

Batson's subsequent battlefield heroics called him to the attention of his division commander, General Lawton. Lawton, also a Medal of Honor winner---in the Civil War, had the reputation of being one of the bravest officers in uniform. Lawton liked Batson's idea of raising companies of Filipino volunteers and in September convinced a skeptical General Otis to allow Batson to raise two experimental companies of what were soon called "Batson's Macabebe Scouts."

Batson quickly organized the first company of 108 men, all of them "well disciplined and brave" veterans of the Spanish colonial army. Within days he and his company had driven the Insurgents out of two villages. Within a week he had recruited another company, also full of veterans. He thought his men could serve as an example to the Americans, especially the volunteers, in discipline and in observing the rules of war. "The men," he told his wife, "were not one-fourth as hard to control as our own men." In October, Lawton, equally enthusiastic, authorized him to organize an additional three companies. And so, still a lieutenant, Batson commanded a reinforced battalion of five companies in what Otis intended would be the ultimate campaign of the war—the campaign that would end Aguinaldo's republic and his Army.

General MacArthur had pushed the Philippine Revolutionary Army north of Malolos in the spring but he failed to achieve the decisive victory he had hoped to achieve before the onset of the monsoon season ended active operations. With the monsoon soon to end, Otis planned for MacArthur to make a holding attack along the rail line to fix the Philippine Army in place while Lawton's 1st Division drove north on MacArthur's right flank, trapping the Filipinos on the great central plain by systematically blocking all the passes leading into the mountainous interior of Luzon. Meanwhile, Otis had organized an Expeditionary Brigade under Brig. Gen. Loyd Wheaton to make an amphibious landing from Lingayen Gulf in the Philippine Army's rear.

Otis' plan almost worked. Batson was in the lead of the Lawton's advance with what was officially styled the "Squadron of Philippine Cavalry, U.S. Volunteers" using "roads in frightful condition." Lawton had nothing but praise for "...the Macabebes, who have distinguished themselves from the moment of their employment, and are now our main reliance and support." On 19 November 1899, straining every nerve to block Aguinaldo's retreat into the mountains, Batson and his scouts passed through the town of Tubao and advanced down a long canyon. Entrenched Filipino snipers contested their progress; it took some time for the Macabebes to clear the pass. At dusk they approached a ford on the Aringay River, two miles from the town of Aringay. Some 200 entrenched Filipinos guarded the ford, and "a sharp fight" ensued that lasted about twenty-five minutes The scouts carried the ford—and two hours later the town—but they suffered substantial losses while doing so. Not the least of these was Batson, shot in the left foot by a Mauser, while he directed his men from horseback. The wound was a bad one, but Batson typically refused to go to the rear in the one medical litter that accompanied his detachment. One of the scouts has been wounded as well. Batson directed that the scout use the litter. Although weak from loss of blood, he rode to the dressing station.

A long convalescence followed. For a time the doctors thought they would have to amputate his foot, but in the end they saved it. While in hospital he heard the shocking news that Lawton was dead—killed in action south of Manila. Eventually, Batson was able to return to duty. He was promoted to major of volunteers but he did not receive the colonelcy and command of a regiment of scouts that he aspired to. The death of Lawton and Otis' return to the United States left no one in a command position in the Philippines who fully understood the role that Batson had played in organizing the scouts.

Batson returned to duty with the scouts in March 1900 and was heavily involved in counter-guerrilla operations—with considerable success—for the next year. The incessant activity these operations required undermined his health. An Army doctor who examined him shortly before he returned to the States thought he was on the verge of a nervous breakdown. He mustered out of the volunteer force when it legally dissolved on 30 June 1901, but by then he had received promotion to captain in the Regular Army. His health did not improve even in the less stressful environment of peace-time garrison life. On 6 February 1902 he retired for "Disability in line of duty from wounds received in action." He was only thirty-five. He lived another fifteen years. On two occasions the War Department recalled him to active duty for short stints as a recruiter. While on the second of these assignments, he suddenly died on 13 January 1917. He was buried at Arlington National Cemetery, in Arlington, Virginia.

The organization he created, now known officially as the Philippine Scouts, continued to grow and eventually included members from other Philippine ethnic groups. By 1903 with the war over the Scouts consisted of multiple regiments with an aggregate strength of 5,000, 40 percent of the total peace-time U.S. Army garrison in the Philippines. By the eve of World War II the Scouts totaled 11,000 men and were organized as infantry, cavalry, and artillery regiments and were noted for their high standards of professionalism.

Medal of Honor citation
Batson's Medal of Honor citation reads:

for most distinguished gallantry in swimming the San Juan River in the face of the enemy's fire and driving him from his entrenchments, near Calamba, Luzon, P. I., while serving as a lieutenant, 4th Cavalry.

See also

 List of Medal of Honor recipients
 List of Philippine–American War Medal of Honor recipients

References

External links
 

1917 deaths
1866 births
American military personnel of the Philippine–American War
United States Army Medal of Honor recipients
Burials at Arlington National Cemetery
People from Anna, Illinois
United States Army officers
Philippine–American War recipients of the Medal of Honor
Military personnel from Illinois